Shenandoah Homesteads Project is an unincorporated community in Rappahannock County, in the U.S. state of Virginia.

References

Unincorporated communities in Virginia
Unincorporated communities in Rappahannock County, Virginia
New Deal subsistence homestead communities